Bandito is the Italian word for bandit. It may refer to:

Arts and entertainment
 Il Bandito, the Italian title of the 1946 Italian film The Bandit

Music
 Banditos (band), an American rock and roll band
 The Bandito Tour, a world tour by American rock band Twenty One Pilots

Songs
 "Banditos" (song) a 1996 song by American alternative rock band The Refreshments
 "Bandito", a 1982 song by Gino Vannelli
 "El Bandito", a 1966 song by René y René
 "Bandito", a song by Dick Dale from the 1996 album Calling Up Spirits
 "Bandito", a song by Twenty One Pilots on the album 2018 album Trench

Other
 A frazione (administrative division) of Bra, Piedmont, Italy
 Bandito railway station, a railway station in the frazione
 El Bandito, ring name of Welsh professional wrestler Orig Williams (1931–2009)
 George S. Patton (1885–1945), U.S. Army general nicknamed Bandito
 The Banditos, a rebellion of characters in the lore of alternative rock band Twenty One Pilots, who oppose Dema

See also
 
 Bandidos Motorcycle Club
 Bandit (disambiguation)